

Function 
Zymogen granule protein 16 enables carbohydrates, peptidoglycan, and proteins binding.

Interactions 

 SGTA
 UBQLN
 UBQLN4
 ASPH
 CTNNA3
 GLYCTK
 KCNIP3
 PUF60
 SGTB
 UBE2I
 UBQLN1
 UBQLN2

Zymogen granule protein 16, also known as ZG16, is a human gene.

References

Further reading